Petropavlovka is a rural locality (a selo) in Bichursky District, Republic of Buryatia, Russia. The population was 608 as of 2010. There are 6 streets.

Geography 
Petropavlovka is located 15 km north of Bichura (the district's administrative centre) by road. Altachey is the nearest rural locality.

References 

Rural localities in Bichursky District